Hilla Vidor (Hebrew: הילה וידור; born October 20, 1975) is an Israeli actress.
Her early career was in the Habima Theatre where she played varied roles. In 2008 she won a prize for her roles in Anna Karenina and 
Autumn Sonata. 

Since 2009 she has concentrated mainly on cinema and television.
In 2013 she won the award for best actress at the Haifa International Film Festival for her role in the movie Funeral at Noon.

Biography

Youth

Hilla Vidor was born and raised in Bat Yam, Israel, a suburb of Tel Aviv. She quit school at an early age and in her youth she moved to live with her grandmother Adela. She planned to be a fashion designer and took a preparatory course at Shenkar, while also working as a model. Her agent, sent her to an audition that changed her life. She decided to be an actress, learned acting behind the camera with Ruth Dytches, and after a year,

began studying three years at "The Yoram Levinstein School of Performing Arts" in Tel Aviv (1999-2001)

During her studies she made guest appearances in the series “Florentin”, “Ha-Burganim” and the movie “Clean Sweep”.

Early career

During her studies she participated in a “Romeo and Juliet” studio production. Vidor played
Juliet and Zohar Strauss played Romeo. After one of Habima Theatre's managers watched the play, she was invited to do an audition. At the end of the second year of her studies in the studio she was chosen to play Adela, Bernarda's daughter, in the play “The House of Bernarda Alba” by Federico Garcia Lorca. Gila Almagor played her mother and Lea Koenig played as Poncia, the servant  

Later, she played in Edward Albee's play “Three Tall Women”.

and also appeared as Jill Tanner in the play “Butterflies are free” by Leonard Gershe

and in the play "Tape” based on the movie. 

Vidor participated in "Anna Karenina" by Tolstoy. She played the role of Princess Ekaterina “Kitty” Alexandrovna Shcherbatskaya. 

She also played in Autumn Sonata, based on the play and the movie by Ingmar Bergman. She played the role of Helena, who is mentally and physically disabled.

Vidor won the Ora Goldberg Prize for a young actress of Habima, for her acting in the two plays.

Her last play in Habima was “Tikochin Bat Yam”, directed by the Polish director Michael Zadara
Vidor played the lead role of Alena.

After nine years, Vidor left Habima. Since then she has concentrated mainly in Cinema and Television

Film

She made her film debut in 2006 when she participated in Yuval Shafferman's movie “Things Behind the Sun”. She played the role of Michal, a lonely and rough lesbian.

she played in the movie “Cold Feet” directed by Doron Eran, based on the book
“Wedding” by Uri Adelman. She played the role of a bride that escapes from her own wedding.

In 2009 she started to learn acting behind the camera with Eran Pesach by the Stanislavski Method, Pesah encouraged her to focus on cinema.

In 2010 Vidor played in Yarden Karmin’s movie “Ezra Rishona” (First Aid). The movie was nominated at the Palme d'Or in the Short Films Category in Cannes Film Festival and also won the Wolgin Prize for a short movie at the Jerusalem Film Festival.

In 2011 she played the role of Dafna in the comic movie “Salsa Tel Aviv”. Dafna is the fiancé of
Yoni (Angel Bonani), who falls in love with Vicky (Angelica Vale) a Migrant worker from Mexico. Dafna does everything she can to separate the two.

In 2011 Vidor participated in the drama film “Wherever you go”, written and directed by Roni Sason Angel. She played the role of Zohara, who is on her way to her sister's wedding, whom she had not seen in a long time. On her way she picks up a hitchhiker Bedouin woman running away from her own wedding (Maisa Abd Elhadi). The film participated in The Karlovy Vary International Film Festival and won the best drama prize at the Haifa International Film Festival

In 2012 she played Michaela in "Summer Vacation", a short movie directed by Sharon Maymon and Tal Granit.

In July 2012, Vidor was selected for the lead role in Adam Sanderson's movie "Funeral at
Noon", based on Isaiah Koren's book. She played the role of Hagar Erlich, a childless, frustrated housewife who cannot find her place in her small town community. 

She played the leading role of Karin in Yosi Artzi's Fiction Drama “Happiness Wrapped in a Blanket”, Which tells the story of Karin and Bashir (Kais Nashef), escaping after the woman kidnaps the baby of a migrant. The film made its premiere in the "Cinema South Film Festival in Israel"

In September 2013 Vidor won the prize for best actress at the Haifa International Film Festival for her role in the movie "Funeral at Noon".

TV
Vidor participated in several TV series such as: "Wings",

"Five Men and a Wedding", 

"15 Minutes" and "Katmandu".

Vidor played Ella,  a mercenary in the series "Hostages", also known as "Bnei Aruba", an Israeli drama television series that was first broadcast on Channel 10 in 2013. The ten-part series was created by Rotem Shamir and Omri Givon. In January 2014, Canal+ acquired the Israeli series.

Personal life

Vidor is active In "A New Way", a non profit organization which facilitates a long-term educational program within the Arab and Jewish sectors.

References

1975 births
Israeli film actresses
Israeli Jews
Israeli stage actresses
Israeli television actresses
Jewish Israeli actresses
Living people